The Ministry of Health (MS;) is the government department of East Timor accountable for health policy.

Functions
The Ministry is responsible for the design, implementation, coordination and evaluation of policy for the following areas:

 health; and
 pharmaceutical activities.

Minister
The incumbent Minister of Health is Odete Maria Freitas Belo. She is assisted by Bonifácio Maucoli dos Reis, Deputy Minister of Health.

See also 
 List of health departments and ministries
 Politics of East Timor

References

Footnote

Notes

External links

  – official site  

Health
East Timor
Medical and health organizations based in East Timor
East Timor, Health
1975 establishments in East Timor